West Copake is a hamlet in the southwestern part of the Town of Copake, in Columbia County, New York, United States. West Copake had a post office until September 24, 1988.

West Copake was the site of Camps Barrington, a Jewish summer camp for boys, founded in 1921, and Camp Rhoda, a sister Jewish summer camp for girls, founded in 1923.  Both camps were situated next to Upper Rhoda pond and were founded by Sanford S. Bettman, a school administrator.  Beginning in 1936 both camps were run by Abe Porchenick (Uncle Porky) 1908-2004 and his wife Ella as well as Gustave De Lemos (Uncle Gus) 1906-1985 and his wife Ruth until the camps closed in 1967.

References

Hamlets in Columbia County, New York
Hamlets in New York (state)